México Posible was a Mexican political party of brief existence which took part in the midterm 2003 Mexican legislative election. The party was led by Patricia Mercado. Due to its not achieving 2.0% of the national vote the party lost its national registration before the Federal Electoral Institute and thus the party was disbanded.

This political group was the main cell for the new Alternativa Social y Campesina.

Political parties established in 2002
Political parties disestablished in 2003
Defunct political parties in Mexico
2002 establishments in Mexico
2003 disestablishments in Mexico
Feminism in Mexico
Feminist parties in North America
Social democratic parties in Mexico